The Doctor Juan Abarca International Award in Medical Sciences, known as the Abarca Prize, is an award that recognises research and innovation through a biomedical finding of global significance.

Background 
Created in 2020 by the Fundación de Investigación HM Hospitales, it is awarded to the scientific or medical career of a person who has made a significant contribution to the protection, improvement or rehabilitation of people's health.

The award, endowed with 100,000 euros, is inspired by the Spanish surgeon Juan Abarca Campal, founder of HM Hospitales. The jury, appointed by the  Fundación de Investigación HM Hospitales, is made up of members of the scientific community.

2021 Abarca Prize 
The first edition of the award was held in October 2021. The award ceremony was chaired by King Felipe VI. The jury was headed by Alberto Muñoz, professor at the Instituto de Investigaciones Biomédicas de Madrid (IIBM) and included Richard Horton, editor of The Lancet, Silvia G. Priori, scientific director of the ICS Maugeri Hospital, palaeoanthropologist Juan Luis Arsuaga, and Federico de Montalvo, former president of the Spanish Bioethics Committee. The Abarca Prize was awarded to Professor Jean-Laurent Casanova for his findings in the field of human infections and the genetic variations that affect a person's ability to fight them. Dr. Casanova is a researcher at Rockefeller University Hospital in New York and director of the St. Giles Laboratory of Human Genetics and Infectious Diseases.

In 2022, the award went to Professor Philippe J. Sansonetti of the Pasteur Institute for his research on Shigellosis or bacillary dysentery. This diarrheal disease caused by the bacterium Shigella causes thousands of deaths annually in developed countries, mainly affecting children. The jury was composed of Professors Juan Luis Arsuaga, Silvia Priori, Jean-Laurent Casanova and Federico de Montalvo, and was chaired by Professor Alberto Muñoz, from the Institute of Biomedical Research of Madrid (IIB- CSIC). The award was presented by the Spanish Secretary of State for Health, Silvia Calzón.

References

External links 

 Abarca Prize
 Fundación de Investigación HM Hospitales

Science and technology awards
Medicine awards